KTFS-FM (107.1 FM) is a radio station broadcasting a conservative talk format. Licensed to Texarkana, Arkansas, United States, it serves the Texarkana area.  The station is currently owned by Texarkana Radio Center Licenses, LLC.    Studios are located on Olive in Texarkana, Texas just one block west of the Texas/Arkansas state line and its transmitter is in Wake Village, Texas.

History
On October 6, 2005, KFYX changed their format from country to CHR as "The Fix".

On January 3, 2011, KFYX changed their format from CHR to talk, branded as "Talk Radio 107.1" and changed its call letters to KTFS-FM.

On January 15, 2015, KTFS-FM changed their format from talk to CHR, branded as "107.1 The Fox".

On January 22, 2019, KTFS-FM changed their format from CHR (which moved to KTFS-HD3 and shifted format to hot AC) to conservative talk (which moved from KTFS (AM) 940 AM Texarkana).

HD Radio
HD1 is a digital simulcast of analog (traditional FM) signal.
HD2 is a digital simulcast of "Hits 105".

Translators

References

External links
Freedom 107 & 740 Facebook
Hits 105 Facebook

TFS-FM
Conservative talk radio
Talk radio stations in the United States